The 1942 West Texas State Buffaloes football team was an American football team that represented West Texas State College (now known as West Texas A&M University) in the Border Conference during the 1942 college football season. In its first season under head coach Gus Miller, the team compiled a 7–2 record (5–2 against conference opponents) and outscored all opponents by a total of 130 to 112. The team played its home games at Buffalo Stadium in Canyon, Texas.

Schedule

References

West Texas State
West Texas A&M Buffaloes football seasons
West Texas State Buffaloes football